Wildwater or white water refers to fast flowing waters in watercourses, thereby, rapids.

Wild Water or wildwaters or variant, may refer to:

 Wild water, or whitewater, formed in rapids.

Entertainment
 Wild Water (Australian band), an eclectic music band
 Wild Water (Norwegian band), a rock band
 Wild Water (film), 1962 Austro-German film
 Pirates of the Caribbean: Legends of the Brethren Court: Wild Waters (2009 novel), a children's adventure novel

Sports and recreation
 Wild Waters, a waterpark in Silver Springs, Florida, USA
 Wildwater canoeing
 Wild-Water Racing

Other uses
 Wildwater Kingdom (disambiguation)
 Wild water buffalo (Bubalus arnee)

See also
 Whitewater (disambiguation)
 Rapid (disambiguation)
 Water (disambiguation)
 Wild (disambiguation)